Bodhuboron was a Bengali language television serial which began airing on Star Jalsha from 19 August 2013. The series starred Gourab Chatterjee and Pramita Chakraborty in lead roles. It was the remake of the Hindi popular show Saath Nibhaana Saathiya.

Plot
The story revolves around a simple innocent orphaned village girl named Konok (Pramita). She does all the household work yet her aunt sikha and cousin Jhilmil cannot tolerate her and torture her daily (Sreetama). She is illiterate and they do not allow her to take any education. One day Indira Chowdhury (Anjana Basu) comes to their home with his son Satyaki (Gourab Chatterjee) for marriage of Jhilmil with Satyaki who already has an affair with Teesta. But instead of Jhilmil she likes Konok and decides to make the latter her daughter-in-law, going against the wishes of her son.

Later both Konok and Jhilmil are married to Satyaki and Avro (Satyaki's cousin) respectively. Jhilmil is jealous of Konok as she failed to become elder daughter-in-law of Chowdhury mansion which may deprive her of inheriting the property of the Chowdhury family. She, along with the evil plans of her mother Sikha creates problems in Konok's life and tries to kill her. With all of these troubles on her shoulder, Konok completes all of her duties & wins all other family member's hearts. Later Satyaki also coming out from his past, falls in love with Konok and accepts her as his wife. In all the troubles Indira supports her as her own daughter making an inherent bond between a mother-in-law and daughter-in-law.

Taking the opportunity of brother's death Teesta comes again in Satyaki and Konok's married life to make Konok's life hell. She pretends as mentally unstable and innocent Konok takes her in Chowdhury mansion going against everyone's decision. Teesta now makes problems to kick Konok out of the house and to bring back Satyaki again in her life.

The show ends with Jhilmil' s death where Avro marries another woman who cares for the twin daughters of Avro and Jhilmil. Konok gets pregnant and has a baby boy. The last scene shows that 25 years later Konok is welcoming her adult son and daughter-in-law.

Cast

Main
 Promita Chakraborty as Konok Chowdhury – Dayananda and Shikha's niece; Jhilmil's cousin; Satyaki's wife
 Gourab Chatterjee as Satyaki Chowdhury – A businessman; Nikhilesh and Bidisha's son; Indira's step-son; Oli's brother; Konok's husband; Teesta's ex-fiancé
 Anjana Basu as Indira Chowdhury – A kind-hearted businesswoman; Nikilesh's second wife; Satyaki and Oli's step-mother
 Sreetama Roy Chowdhury as Jhilmil Goswami Chowdhury – Dayananda and Shikha's daughter; Konok's cousin; Abhro's first wife (Dead)
 Suman Dey as Abhra Chowdhury – Akhilesh and Nirmala's son; Satyaki and Oli's cousin; Jhilmil's widower; Mahi's husband

Recurring
 Suranjana Roy as Mahi Chowdhury- Abhra's second wife
 Kaushik Chakrabarty as Arunesh Chatterjee / Radheshyam- a corrupt businessman, Indira's rival
 Alokananda Roy as Annopurna/ Rangama - matriarch, Akhilesh and Nikhilesh's mother
 Manishankar Banerjee as Akhilesh Chowdhury- Abhra 's father
 Mithu Chakraborty as Nirmala Chowdhury - Abhra's mother
 Bikash Bhowmik as Nikhilesh Chowdhury- Bidisha's former husband, Indira's husband, Satyaki's and Oli's father
 Tulika Basu as Bidisha Chowdhury- Satyaki and Oli's mother
 Judhajit Banerjee as Biresh
 Ratan Sarkhel as Dayananda Goswami
 Nondini Chatterjee as Shikha Goswami- Jhilmil's mother
 Kanyakumari Mukherjee as Teesta Roy- Satyaki's love interest
 Diya Chatterjee as Oli- Satyaki's sister
 Dhrubajyoti Sarkar as Arup- Oli's husband, a doctor
 Subho Roy Chowdhury as Rahul Roy- Teesta's brother, Oli's love interest
 Subhrajit Dutta as Debu da
 Sayantani Sengupta as Sriparna- Satyaki's paternal aunt
 Abhijit Deb Roy as Partho- an IPS officer, Sriparna's husband
 Mridul Majumdar as Mahesh
 Indranil Mallick as John
 Saswati Guhathakurta as College Principal
 Avrajit Chakraborty as Dipak
 Hersale Mallick as Bristy
 Adrija Roy as Putul

Reception
The Times of India states Konok and Indira – the lead characters in the soap – have become household names in Bengal. At one point of time during its run that the CM of West Bengal, Smt. Mamata Banerjee did not miss a single episode of the soap (as was told by Anjana Basu and Pramita Chakraborty at an interview).

References

 http://timesofindia.indiatimes.com/tv/news/bengali/Anjana-Basu-is-the-agony-aunt-on-the-sets/articleshow/45493778.cms?

External links
 Bodhuboron at Disney+ Hotstar

Bengali-language television programming in India
2013 Indian television series debuts
Star Jalsha original programming
2017 Indian television series endings